Grosvenor House is a twin tower complex in Dubai Marina in Dubai, United Arab Emirates.

Background
The two towers, Grosvenor House West Marina Beach and Grosvenor House The Residence, stand at the same height of 210 metres (690 ft) with 48 floors each.  The complex, which is owned by Sheikh Ahmed bin Saeed Al Maktoum, is named after the Grosvenor House in London.

Grosvenor House West Marina Beach, which began construction in March 2003, was completed in 2005 and opened on 21 June 2005.  Upon opening, the tower became first hotel in Dubai Marina and the eighth tallest building in Dubai.  The tower contains hotel rooms and residential apartments operated by Le Méridien.  The building houses twelve restaurants and bars.  Michelin-starred chef Gary Rhodes was the chef-patron of Rhodes Mezzanine now known as Rhodes W1 Dubai, one of the restaurants in Grosvenor House West Marina Beach.

The second tower, Grosvenor House The Residence, was completed in 2011. This  residential tower was announced in April 2006.

See also 
 List of tallest buildings in Dubai
 List of tallest buildings in the United Arab Emirates

References 

Hotels in Dubai
Residential skyscrapers in Dubai
Skyscraper hotels in Dubai
Twin towers